Myopina myopina   is a species of fly in the family Anthomyiidae. It is found in the  Palearctic . For identification see

References

External links
Images representing Myopina at BOLD

Anthomyiidae
Insects described in 1824
Muscomorph flies of Europe
Taxa named by Carl Fredrik Fallén